Brochu may refer to:

People
 André Brochu (born 1942), professor, poet, novelist and essayist from Quebec
 Baptiste Brochu (born 1989), Canadian snowboarder
 Claude Brochu (born 1944), Canadian businessman, former president of the Montreal Expos
 Don Brochu, American film editor
 Doug Brochu, American actor
 Evelyne Brochu (born 1983), Canadian film, television and theatre actress
 Lysette Brochu (born 1946), Canadian writer
 Martin Brochu (born 1973), Canadian ice hockey player
 Paul Brochu, drummer from Quebec, member of UZEB
 Pierre Brochu, (1795–1871), Canadian settler, first inhabitant of the Matapedia Valley
 Yvon Brochu, (born 1949), Quebec writer

Toponyms
 Brochu Lake, a body of water in the south-eastern part of the Gouin Reservoir in La Tuque Quebec, Canada